The 1996–97 Heineken Cup was the second edition of the Heineken Cup, an international competition for the top European rugby union clubs. Competing teams from France, Ireland, Italy, Wales and, for the first time, England and Scotland, were divided into four pools of five, with each team playing the other teams once, meaning two home and two away games per team. The pool winners and runners-up qualified for the knock-out stages. The competition was won by a French team for the second time, when Brive beat their English opponents Leicester Tigers 28–9 at the Cardiff Arms Park. The defending champions Toulouse were knocked out in the semi-final by Leicester Tigers and Brive beat Cardiff in the other semi-final.

Teams
The qualifying teams were drawn from six countries. Generally, these were the strongest teams from the top division of domestic rugby; weaker teams participated in the Challenge Cup:
 England: 4 teams from the English Premiership
 France: 4 teams from the French Championship 
 Ireland: 3 teams representing one of the four Provinces of Ireland
 Italy: 2 teams from the National Championship of Excellence
 Scotland: 3 teams representing one of the four geographical districts
 Wales: 4 teams from the Welsh Premier Division

Pool stage
In the pool matches teams received 
2 points for a win 
1 points for a draw

Pool 1

Pool 2

Pool 3

Pool 4

Seeding

Knockout stage

Quarter finals

Semi finals

Final

The final was played on 25 January 1997 at the Arms Park in Cardiff. The match was contested by Brive of France and Leicester of England. Brive won the match 28–9; they took the lead early on through a fourth-minute penalty from Christophe Lamaison, and Sébastien Viars extended that lead with an unconverted try two minutes later. Leicester responded with three penalties from John Liley, but Brive finally made their pressure show with three second-half tries, one of which was converted, before Lamaison added a drop goal to seal a 19-point victory.

References

 
1996–97
1996–97 in European rugby union
1996–97 in English rugby union
1996–97 in French rugby union
1996–97 in Irish rugby union
1996–97 in Italian rugby union
1996–97 in Scottish rugby union
1996–97 in Welsh rugby union
1996–97 rugby union tournaments for clubs